Quartz Hills is an arcuate group of mainly ice-free hills and peaks standing immediately south of Colorado Glacier along the west side of Reedy Glacier. Mapped by United States Geological Survey (USGS) from surveys and U.S. Navy air photos, 1960–64. The name was proposed by John H. Mercer, United States Antarctic Research Program (USARP) geologist to these hills in 1964–65, because there is much rose quartz in the superficial deposits of the hills.

See also
Dolan Peak

Hills of Marie Byrd Land